Nino Terzo (22 May 1923 – 8 May 2005) was an Italian actor.

Life and career 
Born in Palermo as Antonino Terzo, he worked intensively in the avanspettacolo and revue theater, entering the stage companies of Totò, Peppino De Filippo, Franco and Ciccio, Domenico Modugno, among others. Terzo was also active as a singer, appearing in several operettas.

Terzo made his film debut in 1962, and he soon established himself as one of the most active character actors in the Italian comedy cinema,  usually playing, with small variations, the character that made him famous in avanspettacolo, i.e. a man with extremely slow reflexes and a huge speech impediment, which does not allow him to speak before he loudly inhaled and exhaled. He retired in 1992 for health reasons.

Selected filmography

Colpo gobbo all'italiana (1962) - Maggiola
I due della legione (1962) - Sergeant Tresport
Le massaggiatrici (1962) - Brigadiere Calascione
The Four Monks (1962) - Massaro Calogero
The Two Colonels (1963) - Soldato La Padula
Toto vs. the Four (1963) - Usciere Pappalardo
Divorzio alla siciliana (1963)
Le motorizzate (1963) - (uncredited)
The Swindlers (1963) - Guard at the graveyard (segment "Siciliani")
The Four Musketeers (1963) - Capitano della Guardia
I due evasi di Sing Sing (1964) - Thompson
Oh! Those Most Secret Agents (1964) - Russian agent
I due toreri (1964) - Jannot
Two Sergeants of General Custer (1965) - Schultz
Con rispetto parlando (1965)
Come inguaiammo l'esercito (1965)
Two Mafiosi Against Goldginger (1965) - Un Vigile (uncredited)
Se non avessi più te (1965) - La Bennola
Non son degno di te (1965) - Sergente balbuziente
Two Sons of Ringo (1966) - Jimmy the Welsh (uncredited)
Perdono (1966) - 'Tartaglione'
Non mi dire mai good-bye (1967)
I zanzaroni (1967) - (segment "Quelli qui partono")
L'oro del mondo (1968) - First usher
Better a Widow (1968) - Carmelo
I 2 pompieri (1968) - Officier of Firemen
Zum zum zum - La canzone che mi passa per la testa (1969) - Filiberto Caputo
Il ragazzo che sorride (1969) - Male nurse
Zum zum zum n° 2 (1969) - Filiberto Caputo
Pensando a te (1969)
Il suo nome è Donna Rosa (1969) - Gaetano
Franco, Ciccio e il pirata Barbanera (1969)
Lisa dagli occhi blu (1970) - Carmelino - the cook
Ma chi t'ha dato la patente? (1970)
W le donne (1970) - Sergeant
Lady Barbara (1970) - The Gamekeeper Caruso
Mezzanotte d'amore (1970) - Gaetano
Venga a fare il soldato da noi (1971) - Cocuzza
The Blonde in the Blue Movie (1971) - Customer at Sex Shop
Armiamoci e partite! (1971) - Train Passenger with basket
Le belve (1971) - Orazio (segment "Il salvatore")
Roma (1972) - Trattoria Waiter (uncredited)
Il caso Pisciotta (1972) - Rocco Minotti
Storia di fifa e di coltello - Er seguito d'er più (1972) - Zu' Nino
Ku-Fu? Dalla Sicilia con furore (1973) - Ki Kaka Mai
Bella, ricca, lieve difetto fisico, cerca anima gemella (1973) - Teresa's Servant
Provaci anche tu Lionel (1973)
4 caporali e 1/2 e un colonnello tutto d'un pezzo (1973)
Piedino il questurino (1974) - Fratello di Pascalone
Farfallon (1974) - Capo delle guardie
San Pasquale Baylonne protettore delle donne (1976) - Brigadiere dei carabinieri
La figliastra (1976) - Fefè
Il sergente Rompiglioni (1976) - Cpl. Baffo
La dottoressa del distretto militare (1976) - Pezzullo (uncredited)
La soldatessa alla visita militare (1977) - Corporal at the depot
La soldatessa alle grandi manovre (1978) - Infermiere
La vedova del trullo (1979) - Maresciallo
Café Express (1980) - Zappacosta, capostazione
La dottoressa di campagna (1981) - Gustavo
Chiamate 6969: taxi per signora (1981)
Pierino il fichissimo (1981) - Maresciallo
L'assistente sociale tutto pepe (1981) - 'Lacrima'
Che casino... con Pierino! (1982) - Uncle Nino
Giovani, belle... probabilmente ricche (1982)
Messo comunale praticamente spione (1982) - Assessore Cipolla
La sai l'ultima sui matti? (1982) - Matto che cerca l'oculista
Paulo Roberto Cotechiño centravanti di sfondamento (1983) - Bachisio
Il Bi e il Ba (1986) - Pippo Miallo
Cinema Paradiso (1988) - Peppino's Father

References

External links 

1923 births
2005 deaths
Male actors from Palermo
Italian male film actors
Italian male television actors
Italian comedians
Italian male stage actors
Actors from Sicily
20th-century Italian comedians